Public Administration Review is a bimonthly peer-reviewed academic journal the field of public administration. It was established in 1940 and has been one of the top-rated journals in the field. It is the official journal of the American Society for Public Administration and is published by Wiley-Blackwell. The editor-in-chief Jeremy L. Hall University of Central Florida. From 2018 to 2020, he served as the co-editor-in-chief alongside of R. Paul Battaglio. According to the Journal Citation Reports, the journal has a 2019 impact factor of 4.063, ranking it 4th out of 48 journals in the category "Public Administration".

Editors-in-chief
The following persons have been editors-in-chief:

See also
List of public administration journals

References

External links

Public administration journals
Wiley-Blackwell academic journals
Bimonthly journals
Publications established in 1940
English-language journals